Amata cyssea, the handmaiden moth, is a moth of the subfamily Arctiinae. It was described by Caspar Stoll in 1782. It is found on the Indian subcontinent and Sri Lanka.

References

 

cyssea
Moths described in 1782
cyssea
Moths of Sri Lanka